Barbara "Bobby" McLean (November 16, 1903 – March 28, 1996) was an American film editor with 62 film credits.

In the period Darryl F. Zanuck was dominant at the 20th Century Fox Studio, from the 1930s through the 1960s, McLean was the studio's most prominent editor and ultimately the head of its editing department. She won the Academy Award for Best Film Editing for the film Wilson (1944). She was nominated for the same award another six occasions, including All About Eve (1950). Her total of seven nominations for Best Editing Oscar was not surpassed until 2012 by Michael Kahn.

She had an extensive collaboration with the director Henry King over 29 films, including Twelve O'Clock High (1949). Her impact was summarized by Adrian Dannatt in 1996 who wrote that McLean was "a revered editor who perhaps single-handedly established women as vital creative figures in an otherwise patriarchal industry."

Early life and career
McLean was born in Palisades Park, New Jersey; she was the daughter of Charles Pollut, who ran a film laboratory. As a child she worked on release prints from the adjacent studio of E.K. Lincoln in Grantwood, who was an early producer of films. No doubt the early experience in processing of film was helpful to McLean when she became an assistant film editor, but McLean later commented that her musical training as a child also was very important.

In 1924, she married J. Gordon McLean, who was a film projectionist and later, a cameraman. After marrying, the couple moved to Los Angeles, California. McLean found work as an assistant editor at First National Studio. She subsequently joined Twentieth Century Pictures, where initially, she assisted the editor Alan McNeil. In 1933, she received her first editing credit for Gallant Lady; her work on Les Misérables (directed by Richard Boleslawski, 1935) was nominated for the Academy Award for Film Editing.

20th Century Fox
In 1935, 20th Century Pictures merged with the Fox Film Corporation to form 20th Century Fox. Darryl F. Zanuck was the head of the merged studio, and McLean became the chief editor under his sponsorship. John Gallagher has written that "Studio chief Darryl F. Zanuck was himself a brilliant editor and maintained the best editorial department in Hollywood."

McLean retained this position until her retirement in 1969. McLean had more authority over the editing of the studio's films than is typical for contemporary film editors; as Lizzie Francke described it: "McLean worked during a period when the editor was often left to his or her own devices in the cutting room. The pressures of production turn-over during the hey-day of the studio system often meant that the director could not be around to supervise since they were on to their next production."

Darryl Zanuck not only trusted McLean with the editing of 20th Century Fox's more important projects, he depended on her judgment in many other areas of filmmaking, including casting and production. In 1940, a Los Angeles Times story commented that "Barbara McLean, one of Hollywood's three women film editors, can make stars — or leave their faces on the cutting room floor."

The films McLean edited at 20th Century Fox included The Rains Came (1939), the only time she worked with director Clarence Brown, for which she was nominated for an Academy Award for editing. She was credited with working on John Ford's Tobacco Road (1941), and George Cukor's, Winged Victory (1944). In 1950–1951, McLean edited three of Joseph L. Mankiewicz's films, including All About Eve, for which she received her final Academy Award nomination. Her nomination was among the 14 nominations for the film.

In the 1940s, McLean and her first husband divorced. In 1951 she married Robert D. Webb, who had been working as King's assistant director.

Collaboration with Henry King

McLean began her long association with the director Henry King on the films The Country Doctor  (1936) and Lloyd's of London (1936); she received her second nomination for an Academy Award for the latter film. McLean received three further nominations for editing films directed by King: for Alexander's Ragtime Band (1938), The Song of Bernadette (1943), and Wilson (1944). On Wilson, as Tom Stempel has described, McLean "had to cut down the enormous amount of footage from the 1912 Democratic convention into a workable sequence, and she condensed several bill-signing sequences into montage sequences." Wilson was the only film for which McLean won an Academy Award for Film Editing.

It may be that King and McLean's greatest accomplishment was the film Twelve O'Clock High (1949); Sean Axmaker has written "Twelve O'Clock High was one of the early and arguably the greatest of the Hollywood films to examine the pressures of command and the psychological toll of making life and death decisions for men they come to know and care for." While the film was nominated for the Academy Award for Best Picture, neither King nor McLean received personal Academy Award recognition for their work in making that film. Nearly half of the 62 films crediting McLean as editor were directed by Henry King.

Later years
McLean edited Viva Zapata! (1952), one of Elia Kazan's films, and Michael Curtiz's The Egyptian (1954). She also edited the first released movie produced in CinemaScope, Henry Koster's The Robe (1953). McLean's last editing credit was for Untamed (1955). She was co-producer of Seven Cities of Gold (1955). Her later work was primarily as a supervisor and administrative. McLean was instrumental in the careers of other film editors such as Hugh S. Fowler, William H. Reynolds, and Robert Simpson.

McLean retired from 20th Century Fox in 1969, apparently because of her husband's poor health. She received the inaugural American Cinema Editors Career Achievement Award in 1988. She died in Newport Beach, California in 1996.

See also
List of film director and editor collaborations

References

External links

1903 births
1996 deaths
20th Century Studios people
American film editors
Best Film Editing Academy Award winners
Burials at Pacific View Memorial Park
People from Palisades Park, New Jersey
People from Los Angeles
American women film editors